Studio Olafur Eliasson was founded in 1995 by Danish-Icelandic artist Olafur Eliasson. Based in Berlin, the studio currently comprises about 90 people, from architects, craftsmen, and specialised technicians, to art historians and archivists. Working closely with the artist, the studio team engages in experiments; develops, designs, and produces artworks, exhibitions, and architectural projects; and communicates and contextualises Eliasson's work. Further architectural projects include the Serpentine Gallery Pavilion 2007, London, with Kjetil Thorsen; Your rainbow panorama, for ARoS Aarhus Kunstmuseum, 2011; and the Harpa concert hall & conference center in Reykjavik, Iceland, for which Studio Olafur Eliasson, together with Henning Larsen Architects and Batteríid architects, received the Mies van der Rohe Award 2013.

Institut für Raumexperimente
Established in 2009, the Institut für Raumexperimente (Institute for Spatial Experiments) is an educational research project initiated by Olafur Eliasson, and is affiliated with the College of Fine Arts at the Berlin University of the Arts (UdK). The school is run by Olafur Eliasson together with Eric Ellingsen and Christina Werner, and runs for five years until Spring 2014. The institute is housed within the studio building, and plays an integral part within the dynamic of the studio's creative activities:

"The practice I have developed makes me believe in my works and studio as agents in the world. And just as my works and studio participate in a continual exchange with their environment, with the times in which they exist, so too does the school." - Olafur Eliasson.

The program of the Institut für Raumexperimente - including lectures, workshops and experiments - is a part of the curriculum of the professor's class. A full archive of past events is available on the website.

Take Your Time publication series
An in-house production, TYT (Take Your Time) presents current research and projects by Olafur Eliasson and the studio in the format of an intermittently recurring magazine, with an emphasis on the process of developing and testing ideas and artworks. First published in 2007, Studio Olafur Eliasson has published three volumes to date, all available as PDF download in addition to physical publication:

Studio Olafur Eliasson, eds., TYT (Take Your Time) Vol. 1: Small Spatial Experiments, Berlin: Studio Olafur Eliasson, 2007.
Studio Olafur Eliasson, eds., TYT (Take Your Time) Vol. 2: Printed Matter, Berlin: Studio Olafur Eliasson; Köln: Verlag der Buchhandlung Walther König, 2009. 
 Studio Olafur Eliasson, eds., TYT (Take Your Time) Vol. 3: Driftwood, Berlin: Studio Olafur Eliasson, 2010.

Life is Space
Almost annually since 2006, Studio Olafur Eliasson has hosted a get-together called Life is space (formerly Life in space). Loosely scheduled as a day-long event largely left to intuition and chance, Life is space brings together scientists, artists, scholars, dancers, theorists, spatial practitioners, and movement experts, together with the Institut für Raumexperimente participants and the studio team to share, discuss, present, and experiment.

Although typically hosted within Studio Olafur Eliasson Berlin, iterations of Life is Space have occurred in conjunction with exhibitions by Olafur Eliasson and affiliated institutions. In 2008, in conjunction with Take your time, the first comprehensive survey of Olafur Eliasson's work at MoMA, a symposium entitled The Colors of the Brain took place that brought together a number of experts within the fields of neuroscience, philosophy, and art to review and critique contemporary cultural theories of color that have emerged from artistic and scientific practices. The symposium was divided over three days. Each day was hosted at a different location (MoMA, Columbia University Graduate School of Architecture, Planning and Preservation, and Studio Olafur Eliasson respectfully), culminating in the third iteration of Life is Space at Studio Olafur Eliasson, Berlin.

A number of subsequent publications and videos have resulted from the various iterations of Life is space, which can be viewed on the Studio Olafur Eliasson website.

References

External links 
 Olafur Eliasson website
 Studio Olafur Eliasson website
 European Union Prize for Contemporary Architecture - Mies van der Rohe Award 2013
 Mies van der Rohe Foundation
 Institut für Raumexperimente

Icelandic contemporary artists
Studios in Germany
Danish contemporary artists